PDO can refer to:

Chemistry
 1,3-Propanediol, an industrial chemical
 Palladium(II) oxide (PdO)
 Polydioxanone, a synthetic polymer

Computing
 PHP Data Objects, a PHP extension that can be used as a database abstraction layer
 Portable Distributed Objects, a version of Cocoa's Distributed Objects for remote use
 Process Data Object, a type of protocol frame in some fieldbuses, for instance, CANopen

Entertainment
 Panzer Dragoon Orta, a 3D shooter created by Smilebit on the Xbox
 Perfect Dark Zero, a 2005 video game
 Phoenix Dynasty Online, a 2007 fantasy MMORPG

Other uses
 ISO 639:pdo or Padoe language, an Austronesian language spoken in South Sulawesi
 Pacific decadal oscillation, a pattern of climate variation
 Padre Aldamiz International Airport (Ident: PDO)
 Petroleum Development Oman, an Omani oil company and the part of the Omani capital region where the company is located
 Philips and Dupont Optical, a CD manufacturer that was associated with the Compact Disc bronzing issue
 Protected Designation of Origin, the name of an area that is used as a designation for an agricultural product or foodstuff
 Pseudo-differential operator, a concept in mathematical analysis
 An advanced statistic in ice hockey

See also

 Perfect Dark Zero (PD0), a 2005 videogame in the Perfect Dark (Joanna Dark) series
 Palladium catalysts of the form "Pd(0)"